The Saltmen (Persian: مردم نمک mardom-e namak) were discovered in the Chehrabad salt mines, located on the southern part of the Hamzehlu village, on the west side of the city of Zanjan, in the Zanjan Province in Iran. By 2010, the remains of six men had been discovered, most of them accidentally killed by the collapse of galleries in which they were working. The head and left foot of Salt Man 1 are on display at the National Museum of Iran in Tehran.

Discovery 
In the winter of 1993, miners came across a body with long hair, a beard and some artifacts. These included the remains of a body, a lower leg inside a leather boot, three iron knives, a woollen half trouser, a silver needle, a sling, parts of a leather rope, a grindstone, a walnut, some pottery shards, some patterned textile fragments, and a few broken bones.

In 2004, another salt miner found the remains of a second man. During archaeological excavations in 2005, the remains of another two well-preserved men were found. In 2006, the Iranian Cultural Heritage News Agency partnered with the German Mining Museum in Bochum (Germany), in 2007 with the University of Oxford and the Swiss University of Zurich for thorough investigations. A scientific long-term project was started, supported by Deutsche Forschungsgemeinschaft (DFG) and British funds. Four corpses, including a teenager and a woman, are kept at the Archeology Museum (Zolfaghari House) in Zanjan. A sixth corpse found in the excavation campaign 2010 was left in place at the salt mine. Three hundred pieces of fabric were found, some of which retained designs and dyes. In 2008, the Ministry of Industries and Mines canceled the mining permit.

Research 
After archaeological studies which included C14 dating of different samples of bones and textiles, the Salt Man was dated to about 1,700 years ago. By testing a sample of hair, the blood group B+ was determined.

Three-dimensional scans which were modeled by a scientific team led by Jalal Jalal Shokouhi show fractures around the eye and other injuries which occurred before death, resulting from a hard blow.
Visual characteristics included long hair and a beard; a golden earring in the left ear indicated that he was likely a person of rank or influence. The reason for his presence and death in the salt mine of Chehrabad remains a mystery.

Three of the saltmen are dated to the Parthian (247 BCE–224 CE) and Sassanid (224–651 CE) eras, and the remainder to the Achaemenid Dynasty (550–330 BCE).

In a 2012 research paper, it was reported that the 2200-year-old mummy of Chehrabad had tapeworm eggs from the genus Taenia in his intestine. This brings new information on ancient diet, indicating the consumption of raw or undercooked meat, and it also constitutes the earliest evidence of ancient intestinal parasites in Iran, adding to the knowledge of gastrointestinal pathogens in the Near East.

See also 
 Mummy
 Ötzi the Iceman

References

Sources
 

 National Museum of Iran, Description of the exhibits. Tehran.

External links

 Payvand
 CHN
 Poundster
  Iranian Salt Mummies
  VIDEO: Salt "Mummies" in Iran

1993 archaeological discoveries
1993 in Iran
3rd-century deaths
Archaeological sites in Iran
Archaeology of death
Mummies
Salt mines in Iran
Tourist attractions in Tehran
Unsolved deaths
Year of birth unknown
Zanjan Province